Alan Birch is the name of:

Alan Birch (footballer) (born 1956), English footballer
Alan Birch (trade unionist) (1909–1961), British trade union leader